No. 216 (Ferry) Group was a command of the Royal Air Force (RAF) during World War II established on 21 May 1942. The group was renamed No. 216 (Air Transport and Ferry) Group on 9 September 1942 and placed under the command of Air Commodore Whitney Straight the following day. 

No. 216 Group became a major sub-command of the Mediterranean Air Command that was created at the Casablanca Conference in January 1943. On 25 March 1943, No. 216 Group also became a sub-command of the newly created Transport Command, an umbrella organization of all British transport units worldwide under the command of Air Chief Marshal Sir Frederick Bowhill. The group was sometimes aided by British Overseas Airways Corporation in the receiving, preparing, and dispatching of aircraft reinforcements into the North African and Mediterranean Theater of Operations. The components of No. 216 Group at the time of the Allied invasion of Sicily (Operation Husky) on 10 July 1943 are indicated below.

No. 216 (Air Transport and Ferry) GroupAir Commodore Whitney StraightOrder of Battle, 10 July 1943

On 7 May 1944, No 115 (Transport) Wing RAF was established at Wadi Seidna in the Sudan by redesignating No 2 (Middle East) Ferry Control within 216 Group.

No. 216 (Air Transport and Ferry) Group was disbanded on 26 October 1946.

Citations

References
 Craven, Wesley F. and James L. Cate. The Army Air Forces in World War II, Volume 2, Chicago, Illinois: Chicago University Press, 1949 (Reprinted 1983).
 Richards, D. and H. Saunders, The Royal Air Force 1939-1945 (Volume 2, HMSO, 1953).
 Howe, George F., Northwest Africa: Seizing the Initiative in the West, Center of Military History, Washington, DC., 1991.
 Army Air Forces Historical Office Headquarters, Participation of the Ninth & Twelfth Air Forces in the Sicilian Campaign, Army Air Forces Historical Study No. 37, Maxwell Air Force Base, Alabama, 1945.
Royal Air Force Web.

Military units and formations established in 1942 
216
Military units and formations disestablished in 1946